Ryan Cutrona (born July 29, 1949) is an American actor.

Career 
Ryan Cutrona is an American actor best known for playing gruff authority figures and military men in both dramatic and comedic roles in films and on television.  The second son of Joseph F. H. "Pro Joe" Cutrona, an Army general and combat veteran (Silver Star), he was a native of West Point and spent much of his early life in a military setting.  His first law enforcement roles came on the TV dramas Hunter and DEA in 1990.  He was Captain Margolis in the Top Gun parody Hot Shots! and played a detective in the Sharon Stone thriller Sliver.  He had larger supporting roles in the 1996 action film The Glimmer Man and the 1999 thriller Deterrence while continuing to make frequent guest appearances in all genres of TV shows.  He satirized his military roles in a TV commercial for the KAYAK travel site and showed up in sitcoms like Becker and in crime dramas like Brooklyn South.  He had one of his most notable recurring roles on the political drama The West Wing as the CIA director from 2000 until 2005 and in 2007 begin two other significant TV roles.  He was Admiral John Smith on the thriller 24 and played Betty's ailing father on the 1960s era hit Mad Men. 

He collaborated with Joe Frank on his Peabody Award-winning series' on National Public Radio produced by KCRW: Work in Progress, Somewhere Out There, In The Dark,
The Other Side and Unfictional from 1987 until 2016.

He has performed at noted theater festivals including The Theatre of Nations. In New York City he appeared at the New York Theatre Workshop, The Vineyard Theater, Ensemble Studio Theater, with The Alliance Francais at the John Houseman Theater, The Dia Foundation, Performance Space 122, NYSF, and WP Theater (The Women's Project) at The American Place Theater.  In Los Angeles he appeared at The Mark Taper Forum, Geffen Playhouse, and the defunct but bracing Padua Hills Playwrights Workshop/Festival.

Samuel Beckett granted him rights to perform three theatrical solo premieres of his prose texts All Strange Away at La MaMa.

Filmography

Television

Video Games

References

External links
 

1949 births
American male film actors
American male television actors
Living people
Male actors from New York (state)
People from West Point, New York